In Indiana folklore, the Beast of Busco is an enormous snapping turtle which citizens claimed to have seen in 1949. Despite a month-long hunt that briefly gained national attention, the "Beast of Busco" was never found.

History
In 1898, a farmer named Oscar Fulk claimed to have seen a giant turtle living in the seven-acre lake on his farm near Churubusco, Indiana. He told others about it, but eventually he decided to drop the matter.

A half century later, in July 1948, two Churubusco citizens, Ora Blue and Charley Wilson, also reported seeing a huge turtle (weighing an estimated 500 pounds) while fishing on the same lake, which had come to be known as Fulk Lake. A farmer named Gale Harris owned the land at that time. Harris and others also reported seeing the creature. Word spread.

In early 1949, a UPI reporter from Fort Wayne sent the story out on the wire services, and the turtle became nationally famous.

Curious mobs of sightseers began to invade Harris’ land forcing state police to be called in for traffic control.  

After many doubted the existence of the turtle, Harris made several attempts to catch the beast, including draining the lake by pumping the water into an area sealed off by a dam with the help of Orville Bright and Kenneth Leitch only for the dam to break when the lake had almost been entirely drained. But despite many attempts, "Oscar" (named after the original owner of the farm) was never captured.

In March 1949, an attempt to send a deep-sea diver into the pond failed when the wrong equipment was delivered to the Harris farm.

A photographer for Life Magazine, Mike Shea, took 299 photos at the site, but they were deemed unusable.

Cultural impact
Oscar's memory lives on in Churubusco's Turtle Days festival held each June. It includes a parade, carnival and turtle races.

A turtle shell labeled "Beast of Busco" hangs in the Two Brothers Restaurant in Decatur, Indiana.

A small concrete statue of a turtle sits on the sidewalk at the main intersection in the center of Churubusco.

References

External links
Knot Magazine article

Legendary turtles
Indiana culture
Tourist attractions in Allen County, Indiana
Whitley County, Indiana
1949 in Indiana
American legendary creatures
Water monsters